Mariam bint Mohammed Saeed Hareb Almheiri is an Emirati politician who currently serves as Minister of Climate Change and Environment in the United Arab Emirates.

Education
Almheiri attended the Latifa School for Girls in Dubai and RWTH Aachen University in Germany, where she received Bachelors and Master's degrees in Mechanical Engineering specialising in Development and Design Engineering.

Career 
After graduation, Almheiri joined the Emirati Ministry of Environment and Water, where she was involved in the Khalifa Bin Zayed Centre for Marine Research, the UAE Integrated Waste Management Project, and the construction of a number of facilities. In 2014, she was appointed Director of the Education and Awareness Department in the ministry, where she was responsible for formulating a national strategy to raise environmental awareness in the UAE. 

In 2015, Almheiri was appointed Assistant Undersecretary for Water Resources and Nature Conservation Affairs at the Ministry of Climate Change, after a period as Acting Assistant Undersecretary.

Since October 2017, Almheiri has been Minister of State for Food Security. In September 2018, she announced plans for 'Food Valley,' a food technology hub in the UAE, named after Silicon Valley. In January 2019, she was made an overseer of the Security and Foreign Affairs sector of the UAE's National Expert Programme. In the same month, she launched the UAE Food Security Strategy, consisting of five pillars: diversification of sources of food imports, research and development to increase domestic food production, reduction of food waste, maintenance of food safety standards, and increasing the UAE's ability to respond to crises. The goal of the strategy is to see UAE's place on the Global food security index advance from 31 to first place by 2051.  

Almheiri has also been a member of the board of the Emirates Equestrian Federation since 2016.

References

External links 

Women government ministers of the United Arab Emirates
Emirati women engineers
Year of birth missing (living people)
RWTH Aachen University alumni
Living people